The Centre for Research in Innovation Management (CENTRIM), at University of Brighton, is a multidisciplinary research group that originated in the 1980s.

CENTRIM offers a postgraduate student program, Knowledge Transfer Partnerships and a range of product and services.

Back in 2003 CENTRIM and  Science and Technology Policy Research moved to the purpose-built Freeman Centre on the University of Sussex campus. CENTRIM was then joined at Freeman Centre by members of the Economic and Social Engagement department at University of Brighton.

In August 2010, as part of University-wide improvements to organisation of faculties, CENTRIM joined forces with the School of Business and Law. In early 2013 CENTRIM moved to 154 Edward Street, Brighton. In 2013 CENTRIM drafted a five-year plan that will run from 2014 through to 2019. This plan will be both bold and conservative in its nature, by devoting its time to both Academic disciplines and tasks as well as looking to further strengthen it links to the community and local and international businesses / organizations.

The 2014 Research Excellence Framework (REF) recognised CENTRIM as a leading research institution, with 92 per cent of its research rated as either internationally excellent, internationally recognised or world-leading.

The core of CENTRIM's being is the acquisition of knowledge and its distribution to all.

List of staff past and present
 Prof Howard Rush
 Prof Tim Brady
 Prof Mike Hobday
 Dr Dave Francis
 Dr Andrew Grantham
 Dr George Tsekouras
 Despina Kanellou
 Dr Nick Marshall
 Paul Levy
 David Knowles
 Dr Jose Christian
 Dr Aline Figlioli
 Prof Jonathan Sapsed
 Dr Jeff Readman
 Dr Yolande Cooke
 Juan Mateos-Garcia
 Eugenia Aguilar-Nova
 Prof Bob Sang

References

External links
 CENTRIM
 Brighton Business School
 University of Brighton
 Freeman Centre

University of Brighton
University of Sussex
Educational institutions established in 1987
1987 establishments in England